Ed Smith (born January 13, 1956) is a former American football quarterback.

Early years
Smith grew up in Pittsburgh and attended Central Catholic High School in that city.

Smith's older brother, Danny Smith, has been a football coach for more than 30 years, including stints with Georgia Tech (1987–1994), the Washington Redskins (2004–2012), and the Pittsburgh Steelers (2013 to present).

Michigan State
Smith played college football at Michigan State University as a quarterback from 1976 to 1978. He was redshirted in 1975. As a senior, he led the Big Ten with 2,226 passing yards, a 139.0 passing efficiency rating, and 2,247 yards of total offense. He was also selected as the most valuable player on the 1978 Michigan State Spartans football team that as the co-champion of the Big Ten. He was also selected by both the Associated Press and United Press International as the second-team quarterback (behind Rick Leach) on the 1978 All-Big Ten Conference football team.  He finished his career as Michigan State's and the Big Ten's all-time leader with 5,706 passing yards.

In June 2015, the Lansing State Journal ranked Smith at No. 46 on it list of Michigan State's greatest football players.

Hamilton Tiger-Cats
In February 1979, Smith signed a two-year contract to play professional football for the Hamilton Tiger-Cats of the Canadian Football League. In one of his early games for Hamilton, he threw five interceptions.  He appeared in a total of 16 games for the Tiger-Cats in 1979, completing 61 of 140 passes for 794 yards, four touchdowns, and 14 interceptions.  In May 1980, Smith announced his retirement from the Hamilton club.

References

1956 births
Living people
Players of American football from Pittsburgh
Players of Canadian football from Pittsburgh
American football quarterbacks
Michigan State Spartans football players
Canadian football quarterbacks
Hamilton Tiger-Cats players